Straits Chinese Jewellery Museum is a museum which displays the furniture and jewellery of the Peranakan culture in Malacca City, Malacca, Malaysia. It was opened in October 2012 and housed in a heritage house building that used to be a house of a prominent Peranakan Chinese. The house consists of segments such as living room, two open-space courtyards and dining room. 

Collections in the museum are more than 30 years old, ranging from brooches, shoes and porcelain to rings, which are influenced by Chinese design and motifs and created by Chinese, Indian and Sri Lankan craftsmen. Besides the various types of jewellery which numbers up to 400, the museum also houses the jewellery making equipment and the lifestyle gallery. The museum opens everyday from 10.00 a.m. to 5.00 p.m. on weekdays and to 6 p.m. on weekends.

See also
 List of museums in Malaysia
 List of tourist attractions in Malacca

References

External links

 

2012 establishments in Malaysia
Buildings and structures in Malacca City
Museums established in 2012
Museums in Malacca